Gubino is a rural locality (a village) in Malyshevskoye Rural Settlement, Selivanovsky District, Vladimir Oblast, Russia. The population was 468 as of 2010. There are 5 streets.

Geography 
Gubino is located 30 km south of Krasnaya Gorbatka (the district's administrative centre) by road. Nagovitsyno is the nearest rural locality.

References 

Rural localities in Selivanovsky District